Pirene or Peirene may refer to:

Pirene (fountain) in Corinth
Pirene (mythology), a nymph in Greek mythology
Pirene, one of the daughters of Danaus